The Vishwamanava Express is an Express train belonging to South Western Railway zone that runs between Belgaum and  in Karnataka India. It is currently being operated with 17325/17326 train numbers on a daily basis.

The train was named in honour of Kuvempu's idea of "Vishwa Manava" ("Universal Man").

Service

The 17325/Vishwamanava Express has an average speed of 48 km/hr and covers 750.7 km in 15h 40m. 17326/Vishwamanava Express has an average speed of 45 km/hr and covers 750.7 km in 16h 40m.

Route and halts 

The important halts of the train are:
 
 Desur
 Khanapur
 Gunji
 Londa
 Devarayi
 Tavargatti
 Alnavar
 Kambarganvi
 Mugad
 Dharwad
 Hubbali Junction
 Yalvigi
 
 Byadgi
 Ranibennur
 
 
 Chikjajur Junction
 Birur Junction
 Kadur Junction
 
 Tummakuru
 
 
 
 Bidadi
 Ramanagaram
 Mandya
 Pandavapura

Coach composition

The train has standard ICF rakes with max speed of 110 km/h. The train consists of 18 coaches:

 11 General
 4 chair car
 1 AC chair car
 2 Generators cum Luggage/parcel van

Traction

Both trains are hauled by a Krishnarajapuram Loco Shed-based WDP-4D or WDP-4 or WDP-4B diesel locomotive from Mysore to Belgaum and vice versa.

See also 

 Mysore Junction railway station
 Hubli Junction railway station
 Hubballi–Varanasi Weekly Express
 Mysore–Dharwad Express
 Ashokapuram railway station

Notes 

 17325/Vishwamanava Express
 17326/Vishwamanava Express

References 

Transport in Mysore
Transport in Hubli-Dharwad
Named passenger trains of India
Rail transport in Karnataka
Railway services introduced in 2017
Express trains in India